Adriatica was a bulk carrier that sank in the Mediterranean Sea on December 12, 2010.

Sinking
Adriatica sank off the Israeli port city of Ashdod in heavy seas on the morning of December 12, 2010, after issuing a Mayday distress signal. The ship was carrying a cargo of 3,000 tonnes of steel. The crew of 11 Ukrainian nationals took to two life rafts. Israeli Navy and Israeli Air Force helicopters began search and rescue operations but the crew was saved by a nearby Taiwanese vessel before the Israeli rescuers were able to reach the life rafts.

References

External links
 Ship's information at Vesseltracker.com
 Picture of the Adriatica as the Marvel K
 Pictures shot from an Israeli helicopter of the rescue

1981 ships
Bulk carriers
Maritime incidents in 2010
Shipwrecks in the Mediterranean Sea
Merchant ships of Moldova